The 1st (Risalpur) Cavalry Brigade was a cavalry brigade of the British Indian Army formed in 1906 as a result of the Kitchener Reforms.  It remained in India during the First World War but took an active part in the Third Anglo-Afghan War in 1919.

It was on the North West Frontier in September 1939, and converted to Risalpur Training Brigade (later 155th Indian Infantry Brigade) in November 1940.

History

Formation
The Kitchener Reforms, carried out during Lord Kitchener's tenure as Commander-in-Chief, India (1902–09), completed the unification of the three former Presidency armies, the Punjab Frontier Force, the Hyderabad Contingent and other local forces into one Indian Army.  Kitchener identified the Indian Army's main task as the defence of the North-West Frontier against foreign aggression (particularly Russian expansion into Afghanistan) with internal security relegated to a secondary role.  The Army was organized into divisions and brigades that would act as field formations but also included internal security troops.

The brigade was formed on 1 January 1906 as Mardan Brigade and in June 1907 it was renamed as Nowshera Cavalry Brigade. In 1910, it was renamed again, this time as 1st (Risalpur) Cavalry Brigade. Other than a period from September 1920 until 1927 when it was simply numbered as 1st Indian Cavalry Brigade, it retained this identity until finally broken up in November 1940.

First World War
At the outbreak of the First World War, the brigade was headquartered in the Risalpur Cantonment and commanded the following units:
 13th Duke of Connaught's Lancers
 14th Murray's Jat Lancers
 1st Duke of York's Own Skinner's Horse
 Queen Victoria's Own Corps of Guides (Frontier Force) (Lumsden's) Cavalry
 M Battery, Royal Horse Artillery
 Queen Victoria's Own Corps of Guides (Frontier Force) (Lumsden's) Infantry (at Mardan)

Of the six cavalry brigades in the Indian Army in August 1914, the 1st (Risalpur) Cavalry Brigade was the only one that was not sent to the Western Front.  It remained in India throughout the war, guarding the Frontier (with particular responsibility for the post at Mardan). A large number of units rotated in and out of the brigade throughout the war.

Third Anglo-Afghan War
Under mobilization plans drawn up in July 1918, IV Corps, with 1st (Peshawar) Division under command, would have included 1st and 10th Indian Cavalry Brigades with:
 21st (Empress of India's) Lancers
 1st Duke of York's Own Lancers (Skinner's Horse)
 33rd Queen Victoria's Own Light Cavalry
 22nd Machine Gun Squadron
 M Battery, RHA
 1st Field Troop, 1st King George's Own Sappers and Miners
In August 1918, the 21st (Empress of India's) Lancers traded places with the 1st (King's) Dragoon Guards in 4th (Meerut) Cavalry Brigade and the latter mobilized with the brigade in May 1919. At Dakka on 16 May, the 1st (King's) Dragoon Guards made the last recorded charge by a British horsed cavalry regiment.

Second World War
The brigade was on the North West Frontier in September 1939 under the command of Peshawar District.  It commanded the following units at the outbreak of the Second World War:
 16th/5th Lancers (departed in March 1940 for the United Kingdom)
 Probyn's Horse (5th King Edward VII's Own Lancers) (transferred in January 1940 to 1st Indian Motor Brigade)
 The Guides Cavalry (10th Queen Victoria's Own Frontier Force) (at Mardan; left on 25 September 1939 for Khojak Brigade)
 5th Battalion, 12th Frontier Force Regiment (at Mardan)
 1st Cavalry Brigade Signals Troop (transferred in January 1940 to 1st Indian Motor Brigade)
The following units were attached:
 Royal Deccan Horse (9th Horse) (October 1939 to January 1940)
 13th Duke of Connaught's Own Lancers (November 1939 to February 1940 and April 1940 onwards)
 Jodhpur Sardar Rissala (ISF) (January to October 1940)
The brigade lost most of its units to the 1st Indian Motor Brigade (designate) in early 1940.  In the event, 1st Indian Motor Brigade was actually formed as 1st Indian Armoured Brigade at Sialkot on 1 July 1940. In November, 1st (Risalpur) Cavalry Brigade was reconstituted as Risalpur Training Brigade and in March 1944 as 155th Indian Infantry Brigade.

Commanders
The Mardan Brigade / Nowshera Cavalry Brigade / 1st (Risalpur) Cavalry Brigade / 1st Indian Cavalry Brigade had the following commanders:

See also

 List of Indian Army Brigades in World War II

Notes

References

Bibliography

External links
 
 

C01
C01
Cavalry brigades of the British Indian Army
Military units and formations established in 1906
Military units and formations disestablished in 1940
1906 establishments in India